Susanne Jensby Sunesen  (born 19 February 1977) is a Danish female para-equestrian competing at Individual Championship test, Individual Freestyle test and Team test — grade III.

At the 2016 Summer Paralympics in Rio de Janeiro, Sunesen and her horse, the 18 year-old Danish Warmblood mare CSK's Que Faire, won a silver medal with the score 72.171 percent at the Individual Championship test grade III event.

References 

1977 births
Living people
Danish female equestrians
Paralympic equestrians of Denmark
Equestrians at the 2016 Summer Paralympics
Paralympic silver medalists for Denmark
Paralympic medalists in equestrian
Medalists at the 2016 Summer Paralympics
20th-century Danish women
21st-century Danish women